Kang Hyung-gu (born ), better known as Kino or his producer name Knnovation, is a South Korean singer, songwriter and composer. He debuted as a member of the South Korean boy group Pentagon under Cube Entertainment in October 2016. Kino helps produce much of Pentagon's output, with his most notable songs including "Spring Snow", "Happiness", and "Violet". In addition to his work with Pentagon, Kino has a catalog of self-written solo music, mostly published through his Soundcloud account. He has also written and produced songs for other artists, including Pentagon bandmate Wooseok, A.C.E, Woodz, Jung Dong-ha, A Train To Autumn, Lee Soo-young, and more. As of December 2022, the Korea Music Copyright Association has 60 songs listed under his name.

All credits are adapted from the Korea Music Copyright Association, unless stated otherwise.

Solo work

Works by Pentagon

Other works by Pentagon

Other artists

See also
 List of songs recorded by Pentagon

References 

Kino
Kino
Songs